Drapetodes deumbrata is a moth in the family Drepanidae. It was described by Warren in 1922. It is found in Bali, Indonesia.

References

Moths described in 1922
Drepaninae